John Ewen (1741–1821), is credited with the authorship of the well-known Scottish song, "0 weel may the boatie row".

Ewen was born in Montrose in 1741 of poor parents, and received only a very slender education. Having saved a few pounds he went in 1762 to Aberdeen, where he opened a small hardware shop. This appears to have prospered, but the chief rise in his fortunes was owing to his marriage in 1766 to Janet Middleton, one of two daughters of a yarn and stocking maker in Aberdeen. Through her, who died shortly after giving birth to a daughter, he became possessed of one half of his father-in-law's property. Ewen died on 21 Oct 1821, leaving, after the payment of various sums to the public charities of Aberdeen, about 14,000l to found a hospital in Montrose, similar to Gordon's Hospital, Aberdeen, for the maintenance and education of boys. The will was challenged by the daughter's relations, and after conflicting decisions in the Scottish court of session was appealed to the House of Lords, who, on 17 November 1830, set aside the settlement on the ground that the deed was void in consequence of its want of precision as to the sum to be accumulated by the trustees before building and as to the number of boys to be educated on the foundation. 'O weel may the boatie row' was published anonymously in Johnson's 'Scots Musical Museum.' It is thus characterised by Robert Burns: 'It is a charming display of womanly affection mingling with the concerns and occupations of life. It is nearly equal to "There's nae luck about the house".’

References

1741 births
1821 deaths
18th-century Scottish writers
19th-century Scottish writers
Scottish songwriters
People from Montrose, Angus